L'École Secondaire Catholique d'Embrun is a French-language Catholic high school located in Embrun, Ontario. It is managed by the Conseil scolaire de district catholique de l'Est ontarien.

History 
The ESCE's original location was situated next to the post office, across the road from Paroise St-Jacques and École Élémentaire Catholique Embrun`s Pavillon St-Jean. When the new building was erected, the original was demolished. This is why there is such a large parking lot for the post office.

The school's current location was built sometime in the 1960s, with the extension serving as a middle school being built around 2010.

See also
List of high schools in Ontario

External links
École secondaire catholique Embrun

French-language high schools in Ontario
Catholic secondary schools in Ontario
Educational institutions in Canada with year of establishment missing